Warwick was an electoral district of the Legislative Assembly in the Australian state of Queensland from 1860 to 2001. It centred on the town of Warwick.

The electorate was represented by two Premiers: Arthur Morgan and Thomas Joseph Byrnes. It was also the seat of former Opposition Leader Lawrence Springborg.

Members for Warwick

Election results

See also
 Electoral districts of Queensland
 Members of the Queensland Legislative Assembly by year
 :Category:Members of the Queensland Legislative Assembly by name

References

Former electoral districts of Queensland
1860 establishments in Australia
2001 disestablishments in Australia
Constituencies established in 1860
Constituencies disestablished in 2001